The Kuwait Premier League, known as Zain Premier League due to sponsorship reasons, is the top division of the Kuwait football pyramid system. Formed in 1961, Al-Arabi, Qadsia and Kuwait both hold the best record in the competition, having won 17 times.

History
The Kuwaiti league officially began in the 1961/62 season, after playing unofficially for eight years (played with group of clubs: "Ahli - Al Jazeera - Arabism - Gulf - Solidarity - Al-Qubali, Al-Nahda, Al-Sharqai, Al-Merqab, Al-Mawalim and Al-Taawon). National companies and ministries were club's first sponsors.

1960s
In the 1961/1962 season, several new clubs joined (Al-Arabi,  Qadsia, Kuwait SC, Kifan High School, Shuwaikh Secondary School, Industrial College and Police Team). Al-Arabi won the league title without losing, and winning 7 points ahead of Qadsia, scoring 42 goals and conceding 10.

In the following season, the number of teams was reduced to 7. Al-Arabi managed to win the second title in a row after winning 18 points ahead of Qadsia, scoring 45 goals and conceding 6.

The third season of the league almost witnessed the end of Arabi monopoly, after fierce competition from Qadsia and other teams. Arabi and Qadsia were equal on points before the decisive match. Arabi managed to maintain the title after defeating Qadsia 2-0, scoring overall 42 goals and conceding nine.

In the fourth season, school teams were removed from participating and league saw participation of 3 new clubs (Salmiya, Fahaheel and Al-Shabab). The Kuwait Club managed to end the Arabi monopoly to achieve its first title, after winning the competition without any defeat.

The 1960s witnessed a sweep of the Arabi club when it won six titles against two titles for Kuwait and a title for Qadsia.

1970s
The 1970 era began with Qadsia's winning the 1971/1970 season, for the second time in its history. Al-Arabi lost its championship in a strange way during ten years. They did not win any title during this period until the end of the 1979/1980 season.

1980s
The eighties witnessed three new league champions, namely Al-Salmiya who won its first title in the 1980/81 season, and Kazma club which won the titles of 1985/86 and 1986/87, as well as Jahra club, which ended the 1980s by winning the title.

1990s
The league championship was not held in the 1990–91 season because of Iraqi invasion of Kuwait. Competition began again in the 1991–92 season, which was held as group system with qualification. Old format returned with participation of 14 teams in the 1994–95 season. Era of the nineties witnessed a parity between clubs, where both Al-Arabi and Al-Salmiya won 3 titles, and Qadsia and Kazma two.

2000s
At the beginning of a new millennium, Kuwait SC achieved the league championship after a long absence of 22 years, followed by victory of Al-Arabi for the sixteenth time in its history in the 2001–02 season. Since then until 2020–21 season, Qadsia has won nine titles while Kuwait Club won five. Al-Arabi was able to break their dominance and win the mentioned season title.

KPL clubs (2022–23)
 Al-Arabi
 Al-Fahaheel
 Al-Jahra
 Kazma
 Al-Kuwait
 Al-Nasr
 Al-Qadsia
 Al-Salmiyah
 Al-Sahel
 Al-Tadamon

Source:

Previous winners

Source:

By season

1961–62 : Al-Arabi
1962–63 : Al-Arabi
1963–64 : Al-Arabi
1964–65 : Al-Kuwait
1965–66 : Al-Arabi
1966–67 : Al-Arabi
1967–68 : Al-Kuwait
1968–69 : Al-Qadisiya
1969–70 : Al-Arabi
1970–71 : Al-Qadisiya
1971–72 : Al-Kuwait
1972–73 : Al-Qadisiya
1973–74 : Al-Kuwait
1974–75 : Al-Qadisiya
1975–76 : Al-Qadisiya
1976–77 : Al-Kuwait
1977–78 : Al-Qadisiya
1978–79 : Al-Kuwait
1979–80 : Al-Arabi
1980–81 : Al-Salmiya
1981–82 : Al-Arabi
1982–83 : Al-Arabi
1983–84 : Al-Arabi
1984–85 : Al-Arabi
1985–86 : Kazma
1986–87 : Kazma
1987–88 : Al-Arabi
1988–89 : Al-Arabi
1989–90 : Al-Jahra
1990–91 : No championship due to Gulf War
1991–92 : Qadsia SC
1992–93 : Al-Arabi SC
1993–94 : Kazma SC
1994–95 : Al-Salmiya SC
1995–96 : Kazma SC
1996–97 : Al-Arabi SC
1997–98 : Al-Salmiya SC
1998–99 : Qadsia SC
1999–2000 : Al-Salmiya SC
2000–01 : Kuwait SC
2001–02 : Al-Arabi SC
2002–03 : Qadsia SC
2003–04 : Qadsia SC
2004–05 : Qadsia SC
2005–06 : Kuwait SC
2006–07 : Kuwait SC
2007–08 : Kuwait SC
2008–09 : Qadsia SC
2009–10 : Qadsia SC
2010–11 : Qadsia SC
2011–12 : Qadsia SC
2012–13 : Kuwait SC
2013–14 : Qadsia SC
2014–15 : Kuwait SC
2015–16 : Qadsia SC
2016–17 : Kuwait SC
2017–18 : Kuwait SC
2018–19 : Kuwait SC
2019–20 : Kuwait SC
2020–21 : Al-Arabi SC
2021–22 : Kuwait SC

Most titles

Total titles won by Governorate

Topscorers

All-time top scorers

Topscorers by season

Participation by the years

 

Notes:
1979–80 to 1984–85: Kuwaiti Division One was Stopped.
1991–92: all Clubs participated after the Gulf War
1994–95: Kuwaiti Division One was Stopped.
1996–97: Qadsia SC Withdrew.
2013–14 to 2014–15: Kuwaiti Division One was Stopped.
2015–16: Al Tadhamon SC Withdrew.

References

External links
Kuwait: VIVA Premier League Fixtures and Results at FIFA
xscores.com Kuwait Premier League
goalzz.com - Kuwaiti League
Kuwait-fa.org/

 

 
1
Top level football leagues in Asia
Sports leagues established in 1961
1961 establishments in Kuwait
1